Thargella is a genus of skippers in the family Hesperiidae.

Species
Recognised species in the genus Thargella include:
 Thargella caura (Plötz, 1882)
 Thargella tristissimus (Schaus, 1902)
 Thargella volasus (Godman, 1901)

References

Natural History Museum Lepidoptera genus database

Hesperiinae
Hesperiidae genera